Injebreck is a small hamlet nestled in a deep valley in the central mountains of the Isle of Man, as the crow flies, from Injebreck Reservoir. It consists of a small farm and a plantation of mainly Sitka Spruce and Japanese Larch but in 1990,  were restocked with Douglas Fir, Scots pine, Hybrid Larch and a selection of mixed broadleaves. It was once the site of some highly popular Victorian pleasure grounds.

See also 

 Injebreck Reservoir
 List of places in the Isle of Man

References 

Populated places in the Isle of Man